Hadji Oumarûl Foutiyou Tall (Umar ibn Sa'id al-Futi Tal),  ( – 1864 CE), born in Futa Tooro, present day Senegal, was a West African political leader, Islamic scholar, Tijani Sufi and Toucouleur military commander who founded the short-lived Toucouleur Empire encompassing much of what is now Senegal, Guinea, Mauritania and Mali.

Name
Omar Tall's name is spelled variously: in particular, his first name is commonly transliterated in French as Omar, although some sources prefer Umar; the patronymic, ibn Sa'id, is often omitted; and the final element of his name, Tall, is spelt variously as Tall, Taal or Tal.

The honorific El Hadj (also al-Hajj or el-Hadj), reserved for a Muslim who has successfully made the Hajj to Mecca, precedes Omar Tall's name in many texts, especially those in Arabic. Later he also took on the honorifics Amir al-Mu'minin, Khalifa, Qutb (pole of the universe), vizier of the Mahdi, Khalifat Khatim al-Awliya (successor of the seal of saints), and Almami (Imam).

Early life
Omar Tall was born about 1794 in Halwar in the Imamate of Futa Toro (present-day Senegal); he was the tenth of twelve children.  His father was Saidou Tall, from the Torodbe tribe, and his mother was Sokhna Adama Thiam.
Omar Tall attended a madrassa before embarking on the Hajj in 1828, returning in 1830 as a marabout with the title El Hadj and was initiated into the Tijaniyya, and then assumed the khalifa of the Tijaniyya sufi brotherhood in the Sudan. El-Hadj took the Tijani honorific Khalifat Khatim al-Awliya. This authority would become the basis of his personal authority necessary to lead Africans.

When returning from the Hajj he camped near Damascus there he met Ibrahim Pasha, Omar Tall befriended the Pasha healed his son from a deadly fever, Omar Tall was highly inspired by the trends set by the Pasha.  Settling in Sokoto from 1831 to 1837, he took several wives, one of whom was a daughter of the Fula Caliph of the Sokoto Caliphate, Muhammed Bello.  In 1836, Omar Tall moved to the Imamate of Futa Jallon and then to Dinguiraye in 1840, in present-day Guinea, where he began preparations for his jihad. There he organized his followers into a professional army of around 50,000 strong, equipped with French weapons and western advisors. In 1852 he proclaimed a jihad against pagans, lapsed Muslims, European intruders, and the backsliding rulers of Futa Toro and Futa Jallon.

Omar Tall claimed a transcendental personal authority. He denied the important of adherence to a Madhhab and favoured Ijtihad or personal religious judgment. He taught that a believer should follow the guidance of a Sufi Shaykh who has immediate personal knowledge of the divine truth. Even though Omar Tall never took the title of either Mujaddid or Mahdi, he was regarded as such by his followers. He became the torodbe ideal of religious revival and conquest of pagans.

Initial conquests
Omar Tall appealed to the populace of Futa Toro on the basis of local grievances against the military elites. His community also appealed to rootless individuals of mixed ethnic background who found new social identity and opportunities for conquest under the aegis of Islam. His Jihad began with the conquest of Futa Toro and by 1862 his empire included Timbuktu, Masina, Hamdallahi, and Segu.

In 1848, Omar Tall's Toucouleur army, equipped with French weapons, invaded several neighboring, pagan, Malinké regions and met with immediate success.  Omar Tall pressed on into what is today the region of Kayes in Mali, conquering a number of cities and building a tata (fortification) near the city of Kayes that is today a popular tourist destination.

In April 1857, Omar Tall declared war on the Khasso kingdom. He came into conflict with the French who were attempting to establish their commercial supremacy along the Senegal river. Omar Tall besieged the French colonial army at Medina Fort. The siege failed on July 18 of the same year when Louis Faidherbe, French governor of Senegal, arrived with relief forces. In 1860 Omar Tall made a treaty with the French that recognized his, and his followers', sphere of influence in Futa Toro and assigned them the Bambara states of Kaarta and Segu.

Bambara and Masina

After his failure to defeat the French, Omar Tall launched a series of assaults on the Bambara kingdoms of Kaarta and Ségou (Segu). The Kaarta capital of Nioro du Sahel fell quickly to Omar Tall's mujahideen, followed by Ségou on 10 March 1861. When Segu fell, their king, Ali Diara (Bina Ali), fled to Hamdullahi taking with him the traditional idols of the royal family.

While Omar Tall's wars thus far had been against the animist Bambara or the Christian French, he now turned his attention to the smaller Islamic states of the region.  Installing his son Ahmadu Tall as imam of Segu, Omar Tall marched down the Niger, on the Massina Empire imamate of Hamdullahi.  More than 70,000 died in the three battles that followed. The most decisive was at Cayawel, where Amadu III, the Masina king, was wounded. Djenné fell quickly followed by the final fall and destruction of Hamdullahi in May 1862.

Death and legacy
In 1862, in the quest for new territory, Omar Tall and his followers invaded the Massina Empire (Masina), whose capital was at Hamdullahi. Ahmad al-Bakkai al-Kunti, of the Qadari Sufi order, led a coalition of local states to resist this invasion which Ahmad denounced as an illegitimate war of Muslims on Muslims. The coalition included, inter alia, Masina and Timbuktu.

Omar Tall captured Hamdullahi on 15 May 1862. Now controlling the entire Middle Niger, Omar Tall moved against Timbuktu, only to be repulsed in 1863 by a combined force of Tuaregs, Moors, and Fulas. During 1863, the coalition inflicted several defeats on Omar Tall's army, ending up killing Tall's generals Alpha Umar (Alfa 'Umar), Thierno Bayla and Alfa 'Uthman.

Meanwhile, a rebellion broke out in the Masina lands led by Ba Lobbo, cousin of executed Masina monarch Amadu III. In suppressing the revolt, In the Spring of 1863, Omar Tall reoccupied the city of Hamdullahi, and in June Balobo's combined force of Fulas and Kountas besieged Omar Tall's army there. Balobo's followers captured Hamdallahi in February 1864.  Omar Tall fled and managed to make it to a cave in Degembere (in the Bandiagara Escarpment) where he died on 14 February 1864.

Omar Tall's  nephew Tidiani Tall succeeded him as the Toucouleur emperor, though his son Ahmadu Tall, operating out of Ségou, did much of the work in keeping the empire intact.  Nonetheless, the French continued to advance, finally entering Ségou itself in 1890. Omar Tall's jihad state was completely absorbed into the growing French West African empire.

Omar Tall remains a prominent figure in Senegal, Guinea, and Mali, though his legacy varies by country.  Where many Senegalese tend to remember him as a hero of anti-French resistance, Malian sources tend to describe him as an invader who prepared the way for the French by weakening West Africa.  Omar Tall also figures prominently in Maryse Condé's historical novel Segu. He remains to this day an influential figure in the Tijaniyya and other reformist movements, which stressed the importance of Muslim orthopraxy. Omar Tall's state forbade dancing, the use of tobacco, alcohol, charms, pagan ceremonies, and the worship of idols. Many un-Islamic practices were banned. These laws were also very strictly enforced, especially the ban on alcohol. Omar Tall abolished uncanonical taxes and replaced them with zakat, land taxes, and jizya. Polygamists were restricted to only four wives. Omar Tall, however, was uninterested in the logistical aspects of inculcating Islam such as building courts, madrassahs, and mosques. The primary function of Omar Tall's state was predatory warfare, slaving, the accumulation of booty, and the reform of morals. In the Senegambia, his emphasis during the “jihadic period” is remembered as "not resistance to the Europeans but the “destruction of paganism” in the Western Sudan."

In November 2019, the French government returned the so-called sword of Omar Tall —which was actually a sword of Ahmadu Tall, Omar Tall's son— to the government of the Republic of Senegal.

Lineage of kingship

References

Notes

Sources 
This article was originally based on a translation of the corresponding article from the French Wikipedia, retrieved on July 1, 2005, which in turn cites the following sources:
 Robinson, David, (1985) The Holy War of Umar Tal. Oxford: Oxford University Press
 

English language sources:
Davidson, Basil.  Africa in History. New York: Simon & Schuster, 1995.
B. O. Oloruntimeehin. The Segu Tukulor Empire. New York: Humanities Press (1972). SBN 391002066
Willis, John Ralph. In the Path of Allah: The Passion of al-Hajj 'Umar. London: Cass, 1989.
Wise, Christopher. The Desert Shore: Literatures of the Sahel. Boulder & London: Lynne Rienner, 2001.
Wise, Christopher. Yambo Ouologuem: Postcolonial Writer, Islamic Militant. Boulder & London: Lynne Rienner, 1999.

External links
African Legends page
Map of the Toucouleur Empire

Wolof praise song of Umar Tall (RealAudio file)

Toucouleur Empire
Umar Tall, El Hadj
Umar Tall, El Hadj
Umar Tall, El Hadj
Umar Tall, El Hadj
Umar Tall, El Hadj
Fula people
People of French West Africa
19th-century rulers in Africa
19th-century imams
Tijaniyyah order
African slave traders
Forced religious conversion
Religious persecution
19th-century African businesspeople
History of Senegal